Mohra Saiyidan is a town in the Islamabad Capital Territory of Pakistan. It is located at 33° 23' 10N 73° 19' 10E with an altitude of 480 metres (1578 feet).

References 

Union councils of Islamabad Capital Territory